Uquía (Jujuy) is a town and municipality in Jujuy Province in Argentina.

References

Populated places in Jujuy Province